is a Japanese footballer currently playing as a forward for Omiya Ardija.

Career statistics

Club
.

Notes

References

External links

2002 births
Living people
Japanese footballers
Japan youth international footballers
Association football forwards
J2 League players
Omiya Ardija players